SS Prinz Adalbert, was a German ocean liner of the Hamburg America Line (Hapag), ordered as one of five Prince-class vessels for their newly established service 
to the East Coast of South America. She was built by Bremer Vulkan Schiffbau & Machinen Fabrik, Bremen-Vegesack and launched on 21 August 1902. She sailed from Hamburg on her maiden voyage to Brazil on 20 January 1903, and three years later was in service between Genoa and Buenos Aires. Later the liner moved to North Atlantic services.

In 1912, the Prinz Adalbert was one of several ships to sight the iceberg suspected of sinking .

On the declaration of War in August 1914, Prinz Adalbert was seized by Britain while lying in port at Falmouth, Cornwall. She was requisitioned by the Admiralty, but formally condemned by the Prize Court only in March 1916.  The circumstances had been disputed as she had entered Falmouth after hearing of the outbreak of war between Germany and France while on a normal commercial voyage from Philadelphia to Hamburg, but before the declaration by the UK of war with Germany. Despite being advised to leave Falmouth, the master chose to remain. The ship was commissioned as the accommodation ship Prince at Invergordon on 17 December 1914 and later as the repair ship Princetown.

After being paid off on 20 October 1916 and disposed of for sale on 23 December 1916, the ship was sold at auction in a damaged state to Compagnie de Navigation Sud Atlantique of Marseille on 17 January 1917, reconditioned in England and renamed Alésia.

References

External links
 Photographs of SS Prinz Adelbert and SS Prinz Oskar taken in 1905

1902 ships
Ships of the Hamburg America Line
Ocean liners
Captured ships
World War I merchant ships of the United Kingdom
World War I merchant ships of France
Maritime incidents in 1917
Ships sunk by German submarines in World War I
World War I shipwrecks in the English Channel
Ships built in Bremen (state)